The Southern Daily Argus was an English language newspaper published in Goulburn, New South Wales, Australia.

History 
The Southern Daily Argus ran from 11 June 1881 until 13 October 1885. The paper was published daily and for sold for a penny.

Digitisation 
The Southern Daily Argus has been digitised as part of the Australian Newspapers Digitisation Program by the National Library of Australia.

See also 
 List of newspapers in New South Wales

References

External links 
 

Defunct newspapers published in New South Wales